Pentalinon luteum, commonly known as hammock viper's-tail, licebush, wild allamanda, wild wist yellow mandevilla, and yellow dipladenia, is a vine native to islands of the Caribbean, Honduras, and the U.S. state of Florida.

References

External links

luteum
Flora of North America
Garden plants of North America
Plants described in 1756